= Katherine Fenkyll =

English Tudor business woman draper

Katherine Fenkyll (died 1527), was an English merchant draper.

== Life and career ==
=== Early life ===
Katherine Fenkyll married in 1497 or 1499 to the rich London draper, alderman and Member of Parliament Sir Johan Fenkyll, who owned several ships and imported textiles, vine, metal and other vares from as far away as Portugal.

She was widowed in 1499. According to the law of the City of London, a childless widow as Fenkell inherited half of the property of her late husband. John Fenkell had however willed even more than half of his property and business to his widow and appointed her executrix of the will alongside his brother-in-law Thomas Cremor. He left the use of his ships to his former partners for the first three years, but from 1502, Katherine Fenkyll was in full control of her late husband's substantial business.

=== Business career ===
It was normal and customary for a widow to inherit the business of her late husband, which was a normal background for a businesswoman in this time period. However, while it was legal for a widow to continue the business of her husband, it was common for her to not do so, and instead choose to merely live on the income. Katherine Fenkyll, however, chose to actively continue the business of her late husband, and become an active merchant draper. As a woman she could not become a full member of the guild or Draper's Company, but as a draper widow she nevertheless she had the permit of the society to be active as a draper, and regularly attended its festivities as if she was a member.

Katherine Fenkyll belonged to the elite of the Merchants of the City of London. Aside from the company itself she inherited a house on Thames Street, land outside of London, and several ships. She is noted to have employed male apprentices in 1511 and 1513. In 1515, she sued another businesswoman for having sold her silk of low quality.

=== Second marriage ===
She remarried her former brother-in-law and fellow executor Thomas Cremor (d. 1526) in 1511, but surviving documentation shows that she continued to manage her business despite the formal guardianship of married women. Married businesswoman could however be granted legal exception from coverture in order to manage business, and some married women also secured this right via a prenuptial agreement.

In 1527, "My Lady Fenkyll" are noted to have attended the top table of Draper's Company Election Day Feast to the right of the honorary guest the Prior of Christ Church, with the table set with silver plates she had lend the society. This illustrated her own position as a member of the elite of London Merchants.
